The Neo Geo is a video game platform developed and designed by SNK and supported from 1990 to 2004. It was released in three different iterations: a ROM cartridge-based arcade system board called the Multi Video System (MVS), a cartridge-based home video game console called the Advanced Entertainment System (AES), and a CD-ROM-based home console called the Neo Geo CD. Each system features similar hardware and runs the same library of games through different media formats. Most games were first released on the MVS then rereleased for the home consoles, however some never saw a home console release and eight games were released exclusively for the Neo Geo CD. This page lists every game released for all three Neo Geo formats.

Homebrew development for the system started after the console was discontinued, both by noncommercial hobbyists and commercially.

Games 
Listed here are all  officially licensed Neo Geo games, including all 148 MVS games, all 118 AES games, and all 98 Neo Geo CD games. Not included are unlicensed games, prototypes, Neo Geo Pocket Color games, or Hyper Neo Geo 64 games.

Notes

References

External links 

 NeoGeo Museum (official)
 SNK Playmore official website
 SNK Playmore USA official web site
 Official Neo Geo website
 NeoGeoSoft.com: A complete software and artwork resource for the Neo Geo.

Neo Geo

fr:Liste de jeux Neo-Geo
it:Lista di videogiochi per Neo Geo